Pat Coyle may refer to:

Pat Coyle (basketball) (born 1960), female WNBA coach for the New York Liberty
Pat Coyle (lacrosse) (born 1969), male retired lacrosse player